Hristo Markov may refer to:

 Khristo Markov (born 1965), Bulgarian former triple jumper
 Hristo Markov (footballer) (born 1985), Bulgarian footballer